The 2014–15 season is Oldham Athletic's 18th consecutive season in the third division of the English football league system and Lee Johnson's second full season as manager of the club.

A strong ten match unbeaten run at the end of the 2013–14 season gave Oldham a platform on which to build for the new season as building work literally continued on the new North Stand.

Six of the first team squad who finished the 2013–14 season left the club after their contracts' expired: Jonathan Grounds, James Wesolowski, Terry Dunfield, Anton Rodgers, Charlie MacDonald and Kirk Millar. The club captain Korey Smith was sold to Bristol City. In Smith's place, Johnson signed  midfielders Liam Kelly from Bristol City and Mike Jones from Crawley Town. Joseph Mills, who had spent three months on loan during the 2013–14 season, was signed on a two-year contract. In addition, Johnson brought in defenders Brian Wilson and George Elokobi, midfielder Timothée Dieng and forwards Willy Gros, Amari Morgan-Smith and Jonathan Forte before the first game of the new season.

Squad and coaching staff

First team squad
Includes all players who were awarded a squad number during the season.
*Total appearances and goals as at 30 June 2015

Management and coaching staff

Academy staff

Transfers

Results and fixtures

League One

FA Cup

The draw for the first round of the FA Cup was made on 27 October 2014.

League Cup

The draw for the first round was made on 17 June 2014 at 10am. Oldham were drawn at home versus Middlesbrough.

Football League Trophy

League table

Squad statistics
Source:

Numbers in parentheses denote appearances as substitute.
Players with squad numbers struck through and marked  left the club during the playing season.
Players with names in italics and marked * were on loan from another club for the whole of their season with Oldham.
Players listed with no appearances have been in the matchday squad but only as unused substitutes.

References

Oldham Athletic A.F.C. seasons
Oldham Athletic